This is a list of Watermills within the county of Lincolnshire.

Watermills in Lincolnshire